O Pereiro de Aguiar is a small municipality in the province of Ourense in the Galicia region of north-west Spain. It is located to the north of the province.

References  

Municipalities in the Province of Ourense